Oswald (died c. 776) was a medieval Bishop of Selsey, often called Osa for short.

Life

In 765 Oswald witnessed a charter of Osmund, King of Sussex.

In 772 Oswald received a grant from Osfrith, King of Mercia.

Kelly suggested that "It is possible that Osa was a kinsman of King Osmund, and of the contemporary Oslac and Oswald, who also seem to have been regarded as kings before 772".

Oswald was consecrated between 747 and 765, and died between 772 and 780.

Citations

References

External links
 

Bishops of Selsey
8th-century English bishops